Ricardo Nahuel Roldán Pinela (born 21 December 1998) is a Uruguayan professional footballer who plays as a winger for Progreso.

Career
Roldán is a youth academy product of Cerro. He made his professional debut on 20 March 2016, coming on as a 90th minute substitute for Hugo Silveira in a 1–0 win against Nacional. He joined Progreso on loan for 2017 Segunda División season. He scored his first goal on 24 June 2017 in a 3–1 win against Deportivo Maldonado.

Roldán joined Progreso through a permanent transfer prior to 2020 Uruguayan Primera División season.

Career statistics

Club

References

1998 births
Living people
Footballers from Montevideo
Association football forwards
Uruguayan footballers
Uruguayan Primera División players
Uruguayan Segunda División players
C.A. Cerro players
C.A. Progreso players
Villa Teresa players